Catocala charlottae or Catocala praeclara charlottae is a moth of the family Erebidae. It is found in Louisiana.

References

External links
Species info

Moths described in 1988
charlottae
Moths of North America